Justus de Verwer (Amsterdam, c. 1626 - Amsterdam, 12 November 1689) was a Dutch painter and illustrator from the period of the Golden Age.

De Verwer was the son and pupil of Abraham de Verwer and followed him in style and theme. He produced primarily marine art. From 1651 to 1656 he was employed by the Dutch East India Company and traveled to the East Indies. Then he settled in Amsterdam, where he married Fijtje Caspers in 1659.

References

Justus de Verwer at the RKD database

1626 births
1689 deaths
17th-century Dutch painters
Painters from Amsterdam
Dutch male painters
Dutch marine artists